Harriet Guild (1899-1992) was born in Windham, Connecticut. She graduated from Vassar College in 1920 and Johns Hopkins School of Medicine, class of 1925 (2nd in the class). Upon graduation, being a woman in a "man's" profession of the time, she was unable to find a suitable position and so Johns Hopkins hired her. She enjoyed an outstanding career, specializing in pediatric kidney research and treatment.

By 1928, she was the director of the Harriet Lane Dispensary and a Johns Hopkins University instructor in Pediatrics. She started the Pediatric Diabetic Clinic in 1930 and administered the program until 1946. As a leading authority on children's kidney disease, in 1955 she was the founder of the National Kidney Foundation of Maryland.  Born in Windham, Conn., Harriet Griggs Guild died in May, 1992 at the age of 92. As a medical researcher, professor and physician at Johns Hopkins Hospital for 37 years, she played a major role in saving the lives of children suffering from kidney disease.

Awards
 Baltimore City's Women Hall of Fame in 1985
 Elizabeth Blackwell Award by the New York Infirmary to outstanding women doctors 1958 
 Armed Forces Institute of Pathology medal for contributions to medicine. 1965

References

Johns Hopkins University alumni
1899 births
1992 deaths
People from Windham, Connecticut
Vassar College alumni
Johns Hopkins School of Medicine alumni
American pediatricians
20th-century American women physicians
20th-century American physicians